Tamara Eduardovna Polyakova (born 27 August 1960) is a Ukrainian road and track cyclist. At the 1983 Summer Universiade she won the silver medal in the road race and won bronze in the individual pursuit. Poliakova won the silver medal in the individual pursuit at the 1981 UCI Track Cycling World Championships and became world champion on the road in the women's team time trial in 1987 and 1989.

See also

References

Living people
Soviet female cyclists
Ukrainian female cyclists
UCI Road World Champions (women)
1960 births
Place of birth missing (living people)
Universiade medalists in cycling
Universiade silver medalists for the Soviet Union
Universiade bronze medalists for the Soviet Union
Medalists at the 1983 Summer Universiade
Sportspeople from Chernivtsi